Rónald Marín Duran (born 2 November 1962) is a retired Costa Rican football defender who was a non-playing squad member for Costa Rica in the 1990 FIFA World Cup.

CLub career
He played for Herediano and for Cartaginés with whom he lost the 1992-93 league final to Herediano.
In 1994, when at Alajuelense, he was suspended for 16 matches after pushing a referee.

International career
Marín made his debut for Costa Rica in a February 1990 Marlboro Cup match against the Soviet Union and earned a total of 3 caps in successive games, scoring no goals.

Retirement
Marín has been working for the Road Safety Council since 2011. He is married and has two children.

References

External links

1962 births
Living people
Association football defenders
Costa Rican footballers
Costa Rica international footballers
1990 FIFA World Cup players
C.S. Herediano footballers
C.S. Cartaginés players
L.D. Alajuelense footballers
Liga FPD players